is a district located in Nara Prefecture, Japan.

As of 2003, the district has an estimated population of 50,009 and a density of 1,607.49 persons per km2. The total area is 31.11 km2.

Towns and villages 
 Kawanishi
 Miyake
 Tawaramoto

Districts in Nara Prefecture